Lutibacter agarilyticus is a Gram-negative, non-spore-forming and rod-shaped bacterium from the genus of Lutibacter which has been isolated from seawater from the Suncheon Bay in Korea.

References

Flavobacteria
Bacteria described in 2013